The following Union Army units and commanders fought in the Carolinas campaign of the American Civil War. The Confederate order of battle is listed separately. Order of battle compiled from the army organization during the campaign.

Abbreviations used

Military rank
 MG = Major General
 BG = Brigadier General
 Col = Colonel
 Ltc = Lieutenant Colonel
 Maj = Major
 Cpt = Captain
 Lt = 1st Lieutenant
 Bvt = Brevet

Union Forces
MG William T. Sherman
Headquarters guard:
 7th Company Ohio Sharpshooters: Lt James Cox
Engineers:
 1st Michigan Engineers & Mechanics:  Col John B. Yates
 1st Missouri Engineers (5 companies): Ltc William Tweeddale
Artillery: Bvt MG William Farquhar Barry

Right Wing, Army of the Tennessee
MG Oliver O. Howard
Escort:
 Company K, 15th Illinois Cavalry: Cpt William Duncan
 4th Company Ohio Cavalry: Cpt John L. King
Pontoon Train Guard:
 Company E, 14th Wisconsin: Cpt William I. Henry

XV Corps

MG John A. Logan

XVII Corps

MG Francis Preston Blair Jr.
Escort:
 Company G, 11th Illinois Cavalry: Cpt Stephen S. Tripp

Left Wing, Army of Georgia
MG Henry W. Slocum
Pontoniers:
 58th Indiana: Ltc Joseph Moore

XIV Corps

Bvt MG Jefferson C. Davis
Provost guard: Ltc E. Hibbard Topping
 110th Illinois (9 companies)
 Company A, 24th Illinois

XX Corps

Bvt MG Alpheus S. Williams
MG Joseph A. Mower

Center, Army of the Ohio
MG John M. Schofield
Escort:
 Company G, 7th Ohio Cavalry: Cpt John A. Ashbury
Signal Corps: Cpt Edmund H. Russell
Engineers:
 15th New York (3 companies): Maj Henry V. Slosson
Artillery: Ltc Terance J. Kennedy

X Corps

MG Alfred H. Terry
Escort: Company I, 20th New York Cavalry: Cpt John J. Carroll

XXIII Corps

MG Jacob Dolson Cox
Engineer Battalion: Cpt Oliver S. McClure
Provost Guard:
 Company H, 9th New Jersey: Cpt Edward S. Pullen
Artillery: Ltc George W. Schofield, Cpt Giles J. Cockerill

Notes

See also

 North Carolina in the American Civil War
 South Carolina in the American Civil War

References
 U.S. War Department, The War of the Rebellion: a Compilation of the Official Records of the Union and Confederate Armies. Washington, DC: U.S. Government Printing Office, 1880–1901.
 Bradley, Mark L. This Astounding Close:  The Road to Bennett Place (Chapel Hill, NC:  The University of North Carolina Press), 2000.  

American Civil War orders of battle